Stara Brzeźnica  is a village in the administrative district of Gmina Nowa Brzeźnica, within Pajęczno County, Łódź Voivodeship, in central Poland.

The village has a population of 443.

Notable residents

Jan Długosz (1415–1480), priest, chronicler, and diplomat.

References

Villages in Pajęczno County